Franz Sattler (born 1911; date of death unknown) was a German footballer who played in the 1930s. He played as midfielder.

Sattler played for FC Luzern in the 1936–37 Nationalliga season and in the first half of the 1937–38 Nationalliga season.

Then in the winter break of their 1937–38 season Sattler joined Basel's first team. After one test match Sattler played his domestic league debut for his new club in the home game at the Landhof on 16 January 1938 as Basel won 2–0 against Biel-Bienne.

He scored his first goal for the club in the Swiss Cup on 8 January 1938 in the home game at the Landhof against Concordia Basel as Basel won 3–2. He scored his first goal in the domestic league for Basel on 19 February in the away game against Luzern. But it did not save the team as Basel were defeated 1–0.

In his short time, one and a half seasons, by Basel Sattler played a total of 44 games for the club scoring the afore mentioned two goals. 33 of these games were in the Nationalliga, two in the Swiss Cup and nine were friendly games.

References

Sources
 Rotblau: Jahrbuch Saison 2017/2018. Publisher: FC Basel Marketing AG. 
 Die ersten 125 Jahre. Publisher: Josef Zindel im Friedrich Reinhardt Verlag, Basel. 
 Verein "Basler Fussballarchiv" Homepage

FC Luzern players
FC Basel players
German footballers
Association football midfielders
1911 births
Year of death missing